The Indonesian Railway Workers Union is an Indonesian trade union.

References

Trade unions in Indonesia